Everardo "Ever" Magallanes Espinoza (born November 6, 1965) is a Mexican former Major League Baseball shortstop who played for the Cleveland Indians in 1991. He attended Bell High School in Bell, California, while being raised in neighboring Maywood.

Amateur career
Magallanes attended Cerritos College and Texas A&M University. In 1986, he played collegiate summer baseball with the Falmouth Commodores of the Cape Cod Baseball League. He was selected by the Cleveland Indians in the 10th round of the 1987 MLB Draft.

Professional career
Magallanes had a long minor league career including some time with the farm systems of the Indians, Chicago White Sox, Texas Rangers, and Arizona Diamondbacks. While with the Kinston Indians, Magallanes earned a spot on the 1988 Carolina League all-star squad.

He made the majors in 1991 with Cleveland. He saw action in three games as a shortstop. He compiled a walk and a .000 batting average in three plate appearances.

Coaching career
Magallanes was the manager of the AZL Angels in 2006 and replaced younger brother Bobby Magallanes as manager of the Cedar Rapids Kernels in 2007.  He spent 2008 managing the Rancho Cucamonga Quakes of the class 'A' California League and took the team to within one game of the California League playoffs before losing a play-in game to Inland Empire. He took over as the Birmingham Barons manager in 2009 and served until 2010.

In 2013, he was enshrined into the Caribbean Baseball Hall of Fame.

References

External links

 Press Release

1965 births
Baseball players from Chihuahua
Birmingham Barons managers
Cleveland Indians players
Colorado Springs Sky Sox players
Falmouth Commodores players
Kinston Indians players
Living people
Major League Baseball players from Mexico
Major League Baseball shortstops
Mexican expatriate baseball players in Canada
Mexican expatriate baseball players in the United States
Oklahoma City 89ers players
People from Chihuahua City
Tulsa Drillers players
Vancouver Canadians players
Cerritos Falcons baseball players
Texas A&M Aggies baseball players